Franklin Benjamin Rahming (born 25 May 1945) is a Bahamian sprinter. He competed in the men's 400 metres at the 1972 Summer Olympics.

References

1945 births
Living people
Athletes (track and field) at the 1972 Summer Olympics
Bahamian male sprinters
Olympic athletes of the Bahamas
Athletes (track and field) at the 1966 British Empire and Commonwealth Games
Commonwealth Games competitors for the Bahamas
Place of birth missing (living people)